Matilda Ekholm (born 15 June 1982 in Linköping) is a Swedish table tennis player. She has won four medals in European Table Tennis Championships. She won a bronze medal in women's doubles in 2013 paired with the Spanish player Galia Dvorak. She won another bronze medal in women's team in 2014 with the Swedish national team. She won her third medal, a silver, paired with Mattias Karlsson in mixed doubles in 2016. 4th medal was 2018 in doubles with Pota Georgina. She has also participated in women's singles at the 2016 Summer Olympics, finishing 17th.

Ekholm lives in Sweden and plays for TTC Berlin Eastside in Germany.

BEST RESULTS:
Olympics 
2016 (17th place in singles)

World Championships 
2015 (9th in singles)
2013 (17th in singles)

World Cup
2012 (13th in singles)

Pro Tour Grand Finals
2012 (5th in singles)

European Championships
2018 (3rd in doubles) 
2016 (2nd in mix doubles and 5th in singles) 
2014 (3rd in team)
2013 (3rd in doubles)
2012 (5th in singles)

Europe Top 16 Cup
2018 (4th in singles) 
2017 (5-8th in singles)

North European & Nordic Championships
2000 (1st in doubles and mixdoubles)
1998 (1st in doubles)

Highest World ranking
20 April 2017

Highest European ranking
7 April 2017

6 times national singles champion in Sweden.

References

1982 births
Swedish female table tennis players
Living people
Table tennis players at the 2015 European Games
European Games competitors for Sweden
Table tennis players at the 2016 Summer Olympics
Olympic table tennis players of Sweden
Table tennis players at the 2019 European Games
Sportspeople from Linköping
21st-century Swedish women